Chemical People were an American punk rock band formed in Los Angeles, California, United States, in 1986. The band toured the United States, Canada and in Europe and broke up in 1997.

History
The band's initial line-up was Dave Nazworthy (aka Dave Naz - vocals, drums, guitar), Ed Urlik (bass guitar), Jaime Pina (guitar), and Blair Jobe (vocals, guitar). Jobe left the band prior to the release of debut album So Sexist! in 1988. They followed this with Ten-Fold Hate in 1989, with hardcore pornography a common lyrical theme with guest vocals by Jack Baker on the track 'Black Throat' (for the XXX flick of the same name which Baker starred in) and porn star Taija Rae on the cover.

In 1990, Nazworthy and Urlik teamed up with Dave Smalley to form Down by Law. They returned to Chemical People and released the mini-set Angels 'n' Devils towards the end of the year. The band contributed soundtrack material to several porn films and these were collected on the 1991 album Soundtracks.

Pina left, and guitar duties were handled by Dave Naz, Ed Urlik and by Redd Kross guitarist Robert Hecker, and the new line-up recorded the Chemical People album (1992).

After a five-year hiatus, the band returned in 1997 with a new album, Arpeggio Motorcade, after which they stopped actively playing live in 1998.  Chemical People still remain a band hidden away, playing occasionally in their studio with members Dave Naz, Ed Urlik and Jaime Pina. At some point the band may be back playing shows...

Band members
Dave Naz - Vocals, Drums 1986-1997
Ed Urlik  - Bass 1986-1997
Jaime Pina - Guitar 1988-1990
Blair Jobe - Vocals, Guitar  1986
Robert Hecker - Guitar 1992
Dave Landry - Drums 1997 (Arpeggio Motorcade)
Greg Cameron - Drums 1997

Discography

Albums
 So Sexist! (1988) Cruz
 Ten-Fold Hate (1989) Cruz
 Overdosed On... (1989) Vinyl Solution
 The Right Thing (1990) Cruz
 The Singles (1990) 2" Pecker
 Soundtracks (1991) Cruz
 Angels & Devils mini-album (1991) Cruz
 Chemical People (1992) Cruz
 Arpeggio Motorcade (1997) Cruz

Singles, EPs
 "The Good, The Bad & The Ugly" (1986) Chemical People
 "Black Throat" (1988) 2" Pecker
 Fan Club Single (1988) 2" Pecker
 "X-Feminist" (1989)  2" Pecker
 "Are You Butt Phace?" (1989) 2" Pecker
 Live '89 (1989) 2" Pecker
 "Ask the Angels" (1990)  2" Pecker
 "Cum, Blister, Bleed" (1990)  2" Pecker
 "Getaway" (1991)  Cruz
 Let It Go EP (1992) Cruz
 "Ask the Angels" (1993) Vinyl Solution

Compilation appearances
 The Melting Plot  - SST Records 1988
 Every Band Has A Shonen Knife Who Loves Them  - Rockville Records 1989
 Hard To Believe - C/Z Records 1990
  Gabba Gabba Hey  - Triple X Records 1991
 R.A.F.R. Volume 2  - Flipside Records 1997
 Serial Killer  -  1999

References

External links
/ Official website

Punk rock groups from California
Musical groups established in 1986
Musical groups disestablished in 1997
1986 establishments in California